4486 Mithra, is an eccentric asteroid and suspected contact-binary, classified as near-Earth object and potentially hazardous asteroid, approximately 2 kilometers in diameter. It belongs to the Apollo group of asteroids and is a relatively slow rotator.

The asteroid was discovered on 22 September 1987, by Belgian astronomer Eric Elst and Bulgarian astronomer Vladimir Shkodrov at Rozhen Observatory, in the Smolyan Province of Bulgaria. It was named after the Indo-Iranian divinity Mithra.

Orbit and classification 
Mithra orbits the Sun at a distance of 0.7–3.7 AU once every 3 years and 3 months (1,192 days). Its orbit has an eccentricity of 0.66 and an inclination of 3° with respect to the ecliptic. The body's observation arc begins 8 months prior to its official discovery observation, with a precovery taken at the Japanese Kiso Observatory in January 1987.

Close approaches 

On 14 August 2000, it passed  from Earth.

Physical characteristics

Rotation period and shape 
 
Radar imaging using a delay-Doppler technique at the Arecibo and Goldstone observatories rendered a rotation period of  hours. Based on the radar analysis, Mithra is also a strong candidate for a contact binary, which is composed of two distinct lobes in mutual contact, held together by their weak gravitational attraction. They typically show a bifurcated, dumbbell-like shape (also see 4769 Castalia). A large number of near-Earth objects are believed to be contact-binaries.

Diameter and albedo 

According to the survey carried out by the NEOWISE mission of NASA's Wide-field Infrared Survey Explorer, Mithra measures 1.85 kilometers in diameter and its surface has a high albedo of 0.297, while the Collaborative Asteroid Lightcurve Link assumes a standard albedo for stony asteroids of 0.20 and calculates a diameter of 2.25 kilometer with an absolute magnitude of 15.6.

Naming 

This minor planet was named after Mithra (also see Mitra), deity in the proto-Indo-Iranian religion. The mystery religion of Mithraism was practiced in the Roman Empire between the 1st and 4th century. Considered to be a rival of early Christianity, both religions shared similar characteristics such as elevation and the ritual of baptism. In the Hellenistic world, Mithra was conflated with Apollo. The asteroid 1862 Apollo is the namesake of this asteroid's orbital group. The approved naming citation was published by the Minor Planet Center on 5 September 1990.

References

External links 
 (4486) Mithra at NeoDys, Near Earth Objects Dynamic Site
 Radar observations and a physical model of contact binary Asteroid 4486 Mithra Science Direct
 3D Model Rotating image of the asteroid
 Asteroid Lightcurve Database (LCDB), query form (info )
 Dictionary of Minor Planet Names, Google books
 Asteroids and comets rotation curves, CdR Observatoire de Genève, Raoul Behrend
 
 
 

004486
Discoveries by Eric Walter Elst
Discoveries by Vladimir Shkodrov
Named minor planets
004486
004486
004486
19870922
20230411